Plas Gwyn is an area in the  community of Pentraeth, Anglesey, Wales, which is 131.8 miles (212 km) from Cardiff and 211.2 miles (339.8 km) from London.

Plas Gwyn Hall is a Grade II* listed building. Its gardens and park are listed as Grade II on the Cadw/ICOMOS Register of Parks and Gardens of Special Historic Interest in Wales.

References

See also
List of localities in Wales by population

Villages in Anglesey
Pentraeth
Registered historic parks and gardens in Anglesey